Justin Boyd (born 23 April 1989) is a water polo player of Canada, living in Beaconsfield.

Career
Boyd started playing water polo when he was twelve years old. At the 2008 Summer Olympics he was the youngest member of the Canadian water polo team. Boyd has since been a part of three FINA World Championship teams (2009, 2011, 2013), with the best result coming in Rome in 2009 when the men finished eighth. He was also part of the silver medal-winning squad at the 2011 Pan Am Games in Guadalajara. In 2014 he helped Canada match its best ever result of sixth place in the FINA Water Polo World League Super Final. Boyd began his career with the Dollard des Ormeaux water polo club in Montreal before moving to Calgary to join the senior national team. He has played professionally in Montenegro and Italy. He was part of the Canadian team at the  2015 World Aquatics Championships.

Notable results
Pan American Games:  2011
Olympic Games: 11th 2008
FINA World League: 6th 2014; 7th 2011
FINA world championships: 11th 2013; 10th 2011; 8th 2009

See also
 Canada at the 2015 World Aquatics Championships

References

External links
 
 
 

Canadian male water polo players
Living people
Place of birth missing (living people)
1989 births
Water polo players at the 2008 Summer Olympics
Olympic water polo players of Canada
Water polo players at the 2011 Pan American Games
Pan American Games silver medalists for Canada
Pan American Games medalists in water polo
Water polo players at the 2015 Pan American Games
Medalists at the 2011 Pan American Games
Medalists at the 2015 Pan American Games